Chortodes is a genus of moths of the family Noctuidae. The genus is considered a synonym of Photedes, and may be invalid.

Species
 Chortodes dulcis (Oberthür, 1918)
 Chortodes extremus – concolorous (Hübner, [1809])
 Chortodes fluxus – mere wainscot (Hübner, [1809])
 Chortodes morrisii (Dale, 1837)

Until recently placed here
 Denticucullus mabillei (D. Lucas, 1907) (previously Chortodes mabillei)
 Denticucullus pygmina – small wainscot (Haworth, 1809) (previously Chortodes pygmina or Chortodes pygminus)

References

 Chortodes at Markku Savela's Lepidoptera and Some Other Life Forms
 Natural History Museum Lepidoptera genus database

Hadeninae